World Poetry Day is celebrated on 21 March, and was declared by UNESCO (the United Nations Educational, Scientific and Cultural Organization) in 1999, "with the aim of supporting linguistic diversity through poetic expression and increasing the opportunity for endangered languages to be heard". Its purpose is to promote the reading, writing, publishing, and teaching of poetry throughout the world and, as the original UNESCO declaration says, to "give fresh recognition and impetus to national, regional, and international poetry movements".

It was generally celebrated in October, but in the 20th century the world community celebrated it on the 15th, the birthday of Virgil, the Roman epic poet and poet laureate under Augustus. The tradition to keep an October date for national or international poetry day celebrations still holds in many countries. The United Kingdom generally uses the first Thursday in October, but elsewhere a different October, or even sometimes a November date, is celebrated.

WorldPoetryDay UNESCO has it on the calendar because PEN International had officially proposed it upon Tarık Günersel's presentation at the '97 Congress in Edinburgh — as suggested by PEN Turkey and seconded by Melbourne PEN. (In '96 initiated by Tarık Günersel and Gülseli Inal et al. — Poetic Space Lab)

The 2021 World Poetry Day in the UNESCO headquarters in Paris was dedicated to the celebration of the 100th anniversary of the birth of the great Macedonian poet, writer, literary translator and linguistic scholar Blaže Koneski. At the same time, the British poet Carol Ann Duffy was announced as the recipient of the Golden Wreath Award of the Struga Poetry Evenings for 2021.

See also

United Nations
National Poetry Day, held in October in the United Kingdom
National Poetry Month, held in April in the United States and Canada
 Honorary Poets, chosen on 1 November, Poetry Day in the Korea

References

External links
 Kavishala -The School of Poets
"World Poetry Day, 21 March" at un.org
UN International Observances Calendar
"Jaipur Based Young Poets Celebrated World Poetry Day on 21 March 2017 at O2 The Plant Cafe"

March observances
Poetry festivals
Poetry Day, World
UNESCO